Temporal information retrieval (T-IR) is an emerging area of research related to the field of information retrieval (IR) and a considerable number of sub-areas, positioning itself, as an important dimension in the context of the user information needs.

According to information theory science (Metzger, 2007), timeliness or currency is one of the key five aspects that determine a document's credibility besides relevance, accuracy, objectivity and coverage. One can provide many examples when the returned search results are of little value due to temporal problems such as obsolete data on weather, outdated information about a given company's earnings or information on already-happened or invalid predictions.

T-IR, in general, aims at satisfying these temporal needs and at combining traditional notions of document relevance with the so-called temporal relevance. This will enable the return of temporally relevant documents, thus providing a temporal overview of the results in the form of timeliness or similar structures. It also shows to be very useful for query understanding, query disambiguation, query classification, result diversification and so on.

This article contains a list of the most important research in temporal information retrieval (T-IR) and its related sub-areas. As several of the referred works are related with different research areas a single article can be found in more than one different table. For ease of reading the articles are categorized in a number of different sub-areas referring to its main scope, in detail.

Temporal dynamics (T-dynamics)

Temporal markup languages (T-MLanguages)

Temporal taggers (T-taggers)

Temporal indexing (T-indexing)

Temporal query understanding (TQ-understanding)

Time-aware retrieval/ranking models (T-RModels)

Temporal clustering (T-clustering)

Temporal text classification (T-classification)

Temporal visualization (T-interfaces)

Temporal search engines (T-SEngine)

Temporal question answering (T-QAnswering)

Temporal snippets (T-snippets)

Future information retrieval (F-IRetrieval)

Temporal image retrieval (T-IRetrieval)

Collective memory (C-memory)

Web archives (W-archives)

Topic detection and tracking (TDT)

References

Information retrieval genres